HNoMS Stavanger (pennant number F303) was an  of the Royal Norwegian Navy.

Stavanger was decommissioned in 1998. She was later used for target practice and sunk in 2001 by a single DM2A3 torpedo launched from the  Utstein.

1966 ships
Ships built in Horten
Oslo-class frigates
Cold War frigates of Norway
Ships sunk as targets
Ships sunk by Norwegian submarines